Anton Flavian de Ripa was the 35th Grand Master of the Knights Hospitaller from 1421 until his death in Rhodes in 1437.

References

1437 deaths
Grand Masters of the Knights Hospitaller
Year of birth missing